Salar de Pedernales is a large salt flat in the Atacama Region of Chile. It is located just to the west of the Cordillera de Claudio Gay. A small lake still exists in the salt flat and provides a habitat for birds such as the Andean flamingo.

Salar de Pedernales appears to exist thanks to faults, some of which have been identified on its western side and others have influenced the positions of springs.

Gallery

References

Pedernales
Landforms of Atacama Region